A Million Suns is the fourth studio album from Australian singer-songwriter Shannon Noll. The album was the first release through Universal Music Australia and was released on 14 October 2011 in Australia.

Noll embarked on his A Million Suns Tour in 2012 to promote the album.

Reception

Jon O'Brien from AllMusic gave the album 3 out of 5 saying "A Million Suns should ensure that Noll remains one of Australian Idol's most enduring contestants, but it's merely a competent return rather than an "all guns blazing" comeback." adding ""My Place in the Line" and "Living in Stereo" are arena-sized anthems that might briefly satisfy those waiting impatiently for the next Bryan Adams record, the impassioned melodies of the lead single, "Switch Me On," echo the radio-friendly AOR of Goo Goo Dolls...  while "Til We Say So" and the title track are blistering slices of blue-collar rock that showcase Noll's vocals at their most gravelly."

Track listing

 "Switch Me On" – 3:26
 "A Million Suns" – 3:12
 "My Place in the Line" – 3:55
 "Come Home" – 3:40
 "Rewind" – 4:00
 "Til We Say So" – 3:46
 "Long Way Home" – 3:47
 "Living in Stereo" – 3:32
 "Path of Gold" – 3:34
 "Collide" – 3:47
 "Would It Be So Bad" – 3:55
 "It's a Man's Man's World" – 3:13

Charts

Weekly charts

Year-end charts

Release history

References

2011 albums
Shannon Noll albums